Minthopsis is a genus of parasitic flies in the family Tachinidae.

Species
Minthopsis vittata Townsend, 1915

Distribution
Peru.

References

Exoristinae
Tachinidae genera
Taxa named by Charles Henry Tyler Townsend
Diptera of South America
Monotypic Brachycera genera